A list of films produced by the Bollywood film industry based in Mumbai

Top-grossing films
The top-grossing films at the Indian Box Office in 
1986:

Films A-D

Films E-P

Films Q-Z

References

External links
 Bollywood films of 1986 at the Internet Movie Database

1986
Bollywood
Films, Bollywood